Squads for the 1984 AFC Asian Cup tournament.

Group A

Head coach:  Antônio Lopes

(N°1) Khaled Al-Shemmari GK Kazma Sporting Club Kuwait
(N°7) Abdullah Al-Shemmari MF Kuwait SC Kuwait

Head coach:  Ronaldo de Carvalho

(N°3)  Majed MaayouF DF  04/10/1961 QAT                                                                                                                                                                                                         
(N°6)  Ibrahim Saeed Al- Rumaihi DF / / 19 QAT  Al Ahli SC (Doha) Qatar                                                                                                                                                                                                       
(N°13) Mohammed Al-Mohanadi FW 10/10/1972 QAT
(N°18) Sami Mohamed Wafa  GK / / 19 Al Saad SC Qatar

Saudi Arabia 

Head coach: Khalil Al-Zayani

Head coach:  Moon Jung-sik

Head coach: Avedis Kavlakian

Group B

Head coach: Zeng Xuelin

Head coach:  Milovan Ćirić

Head coach: Nasser Ebrahimi

Head coach: Hussein Al-Junied

Head coach:  Carlos Alberto Parreira

External links
National Library of Singapore - The Straits Times 1 December 1984
Yansfield - South Korea International Matches - Details 1980-89
Yansfield - China International Matches - Details 1980-89
Team Melli
Information Database on Indian Football 
China National Football Team Database
亚洲杯 at cnsoccer.titan24.com

AFC Asian Cup squads